The 76 mm regimental gun M1927 was a Soviet infantry support gun. The gun was developed in 1927 by the design bureau of Orudiyno-Arsenalny Trest (OAT) and entered production in 1928. A total of 18,116 pieces were built. On June 22, 1941, the Red Army had 4,708 of these guns. In 1943 the gun was replaced in production by the 76 mm regimental gun M1943, but remained in service until the end of the war. The Germans placed captured guns into service as the 7.62 cm Infanteriekanonehaubitze 290(r) (infantry gun-howitzer), while in the Finnish army they were known as 76 RK/27.

The gun was intended for destruction of light field fortifications and openly placed personnel by direct fire. HEAT shell gave it limited anti-tank capabilities. It was chambered for the same shell size as 76.2mm divisional guns, but with a reduced propellant charge. Since firing higher-power divisional gun ammunition could damage the gun, the shell flange was modified so that divisional gun ammunition couldn't be loaded into the chamber of the regimental gun.

The M1927 was issued to rifle and cavalry regiments of the Red Army. Artillery battalion of rifle brigade included one battery of M1927. Some guns were used by anti-tank artillery battalions.

Ammunition
Ammunition types:
Fragmentation-HE: OF-350.
Fragmentation: O-350A.
HEAT: BP-350M.
Projectile weight:
OF-350: 
Muzzle velocity:
OF-350, O-350A: 
BP-350M: 
Effective range:
OF-350, O-350A: 
BP-350M:

76 mm regimental gun M1943
The M1943 used a modernized barrel from the 76 mm regimental gun M1927 and the split-trail carriage from the 45 mm anti-tank gun M1942 (M-42).

Self-Propelled Guns
SU-12 - The M1927 was mounted on a shielded pedestal mount on a modified GAZ-AAA truck, and was in production from 1933 to 1935.
SU-26 - The M1927 was mounted on a pedestal mount with a triangular shield on the chassis of the T-26 tank.

Tank Guns

The 76 mm KT was installed in these Soviet tanks:
BT-7A - The 76 mm KT was installed in a new turret on the chassis of the BT-7.
T-26-4 - The 76 mm KT was installed in a new turret on the chassis of the T-26 .
T-28 - The primary turret of early versions of the T-28 was armed with a 76 mm KT.
T-35 - The primary turret was armed with a 76 mm KT.

Gallery

References

External links
 Chamberlain, Peter & Gander, Terry. Infantry, Mountain and Airborne Guns. New York: Arco, 1975
 Gander, Terry and Chamberlain, Peter. Weapons of the Third Reich: An Encyclopedic Survey of All Small Arms, Artillery and Special Weapons of the German Land Forces 1939-1945. New York: Doubleday, 1979 
 Ivanov A. - Artillery of the USSR in Second World War - SPb Neva, 2003 (Иванов А. Артиллерия СССР во Второй Мировой войне. — СПб., Издательский дом Нева, 2003.)
 Shunkov V. N. - The Weapons of the Red Army, Mn. Harvest, 1999 (Шунков В. Н. - Оружие Красной Армии. — Мн.: Харвест, 1999.) 
 76.2-mm Regimental gun model 1927 on the BattleField.Ru 

World War II field artillery
World War II artillery of the Soviet Union
76 mm artillery
Weapons and ammunition introduced in 1927